Random Acts of Romance (originally titled Love Bites) is a 2012 American comedy film directed by Katrin Bowen, starring Robert Moloney, Laura Bertram, Amanda Tapping and Zak Santiago.

Cast
 Robert Moloney as David
 Laura Bertram as Holly
 Amanda Tapping as Diane
 Zak Santiago as Matt
 Ted Whittall as Richard
 Katharine Isabelle as Bud
 Sonja Bennett as Lynne
 Lisa Chandler as Sarah
 Taylor St. Pierre as Young husband
 Emily Bett Rickards as Young wife
 Nicholas Carella as Saul
 Morgan Brayton as Gwen
 Christina Jastrzembska as Mrs. Anderson
 Diana Pavlovská as Cooking lady

Release
The film premiered at the Vancouver International Film Festival on 5 October 2012. It opened in theatres in Canada on 8 November 2013.

Reception
Katherine Monk of Canada.com rated the film 3 stars out of 5 and wrote that there is "enough selection at the emotional buffet to keep our psychological palate amused." The Globe and Mail wrote that while the film "manages to transcend the hokey, overused bunch-of-connected-people-and-hey-some-of-them-are-at-the-same-restaurant-on-the-same-night construct with some really nice writing, and strong performances", the relationship between Matt and Diane "doesn't ring true".

Glen Schaefer of The Province wrote that while the film "deserves credit for its ambition and some snappy dialogue", it "falls down in its depiction of characters whose behaviours are all quirk and no reality." Chris Knight of the National Post wrote that the film "never quite gathers the momentum promised in the opening scenes."

Radheyan Simonpillai of Now wrote that "If there are any sincere ideas about modern love buried within Katrin Bowen’s Random Acts Of Romance, they’re barely visible beneath all the frivolity, contrivance and foolishness."

References

External links
 
 

Canadian comedy films
2012 comedy films